Partisan may refer to:

Military
 Partisan (weapon), a pole weapon
 Partisan (military), paramilitary forces engaged behind the front line
Yugoslav Partisans, communist-led, anti-fascist resistance against Nazi Germany and the Independent State of Croatia during WWII
Italian Partisans, communist-led, anti-fascist resistance against the Fascist Italian Social Republic during the Italian Civil War

Films
 Partisan (film), a 2015 Australian film
 Hell River, a 1974 Yugoslavian film also known as Partisans

Music
 Partisan Records, an American independent record label
 The Partisans (band), a 1980s punk and Oi! band
 "The Partisan", a World War II anti-fascist song, later popularized by Leonard Cohen

Other uses
 Partisan (politics), a committed member of a political party
 Partisans (novel), a 1982 novel by Alistair MacLean about the Yugoslav partisans
 Partisan game, in combinatorial game theory
 Partisans (architectural firm), an architecture firm based in Toronto
 The Partisans (sculpture), in Boston

See also
 Partisan Review, a United States political and literary quarterly
 Partizan (disambiguation)
 Partizani (disambiguation)